TGM may refer to:

People
Tomáš Garrigue Masaryk, first President of Czechoslovakia
Gáspár Miklós Tamás (Hungarian: Tamás Gáspár Miklós), Hungarian philosopher

Organizations
Târgu Mureș International Airport, IATA airport code in Romania
Tellings-Golden Miller, UK bus company
Tunis-Goulette-Marsa, a railway line in Tunisia

Other
TGM is the station code for Teignmouth railway station
Tetris: The Grand Master, a video game
Tom Pendlebury's TGM system, a System of measurement in Duodecimal
Top Gun: Maverick, a 2022 action drama film
Total gaseous mercury, a measurement of mercury concentration used in toxicology research
Transglutaminase, an enzyme